Laurențiu Adrian Bogoi (born 16 February 1973) is a Romanian former professional footballer who played as a defender. Bogoi played in the Liga I for: Rapid București, Chindia Târgoviște, Argeș Pitești and Pandurii Târgu Jiu. After retirement Bogoi was the chairman of CSM Târgoviște and managed teams like: FCM Târgoviște, Chindia Târgoviște and Pandurii II Târgu Jiu. Currently he is the manager of Liga II side Pandurii Târgu Jiu.

References

External links
 
 

1973 births
Living people
Sportspeople from Târgoviște
Romanian footballers
Association football defenders
Liga I players
Liga II players
FC Rapid București players
FCM Târgoviște players
FC Argeș Pitești players
CS Gaz Metan Mediaș players
CS Pandurii Târgu Jiu players
Romanian football managers
AFC Chindia Târgoviște managers
CS Pandurii Târgu Jiu managers